Kanakanak is a neighborhood within the city of Dillingham in the Dillingham Census Area in the U.S. state of Alaska. Kanakanak is the location of an Indian Health Service hospital operated by the Bristol Bay Area Health Corporation.

The name has been cited as the longest geographic palindrome. It is Yupik in origin and is said to mean "many noses," referring to the orphanage census that was located at the Kanakanak site after the 1918-1919 influenza epidemic.

References

External links
 Kanakanak Hospital - Bristol Bay Area Health Corporation website

Populated places in Dillingham Census Area, Alaska
Neighborhoods in Alaska